Targhee Pass is a mountain pass in the western United States on the Continental Divide. The pass is named for a Bannock chief.

The pass provides the most direct access to the park from southern Idaho.

The pass is located in the Caribou–Targhee National Forest. Henrys Lake, the headwaters of the Henrys Fork, a tributary of the Snake River is located just west of the pass. Hebgen Lake, a reservoir on the Madison River, a tributary of the Missouri River, is located just north of the pass.

Nez Perce War
During the Nez Perce War in 1877, Chief Joseph's band of Nez Perce traversed the pass on August 22 while evading U.S. Cavalry forces under the command of General Oliver O. Howard.  The Nez Perce had just engaged the army in the Idaho Territory at the Battle of Camas Creek.  After entering Montana Territory, the Indians moved east up the Madison River into Yellowstone National Park.

See also
 Mountain passes in Montana

Notes

Landforms of Fremont County, Idaho
Landforms of Gallatin County, Montana
Mountain passes of Idaho
Mountain passes of Montana
Great Divide of North America
Transportation in Fremont County, Idaho
Transportation in Gallatin County, Montana
U.S. Route 20